The 1968 Iowa State Cyclones football team represented Iowa State University in the Big Eight Conference during the 1968 NCAA University Division football season. In their first year under head coach Johnny Majors, the Cyclones compiled a 3–7 record (1–6 against conference opponents), finished in last place in the conference, and were outscored by opponents by a combined total of 273 to 178. They played their home games at Clyde Williams Field in Ames, Iowa.

George Dimitri and John Warder were the team captains.

Schedule

Coaching staff

Roster

References

Iowa State
Iowa State Cyclones football seasons
Iowa State Cyclones football